Wandering womb was the belief that a displaced uterus was the cause of many medical pathologies in women. The belief is first attested in the medical texts of ancient Greece, but it persisted in European academic medicine and popular thought for centuries. The wandering womb as a concept was popularized by doctor Edward Jorden, who published The Suffocation of the Mother in 1603. Suffocation of the Mother was the first text on the subjects of the wandering womb and hysteria that was written in English.

Origins
The belief in the "wandering womb" was found in ancient Greece. Some scholars have argued that it originated in Egypt, but this has now been disproved. One description of the theory of a "wandering womb" comes from Aretaeus, a physician from Cappadocia, who was a contemporary of Galen in the 2nd century AD. He wrote that the uterus could move out of place, and float within the body. In the translation of Francis Adams (1856) this reads: 

The Greek translated here as "like an animal within an animal" would be better translated as "like a living thing inside another living thing". The belief that the uterus could move freely, which this imagery evokes, was linked to the use of scent therapy to entice it up or down within the body. This may have been part of ancient cultural beliefs in Greece, but the earliest known written accounts of it are in the fifth- and fourth-century BCE texts associated with the name of Hippocrates. The movement of the uterus was believed to cause symptoms throughout the body, depending on the destination to which the uterus moved in search of fluid.

Opposing views
Soranus of Ephesus, another second century CE physician, opposed the theory of the "wandering womb". In a description of what he labelled "hysterical suffocation" – suffocation arising in the uterus – Soranus wrote, "the uterus does not issue forth like a wild animal from the lair, delighted by fragrant odors and fleeing bad odors, rather it is drawn together because of stricture caused by inflammation". Where Aretaeus used the more neutral "living thing", Soranus used the term for "wild beast", therion. Galen also insisted that the uterus was stationary and that symptoms were due to substances being retained inside it. This suggests that Aretaeus was unusual among physicians of his period in believing in a mobile and animate womb. Despite the fact that Soranus was an influential writer on gynecology, and that Galen was the Greco-Roman medical writer with the greatest overall influence on Medieval and Renaissance medicine in Europe, the belief in the "wandering womb" continued for centuries, for example in Edward Jorden's influential 1603 treatise on the supposed bewitching of 14 year-old Mary Glover.

Hysteria

The idea of a condition called hysteria caused by "wandering womb" developed from the "hysterical suffocation" of ancient Greek writers. Medical researchers developed a better understanding of anatomy after the invention of microscopes in the 17th century and cellular research in the 19th century. Sigmund Freud's theory of the free-floating unconscious, the "mind within the mind", was similar to the ancient belief in the "animal within the animal".

Edward Jorden, author of The Suffocation of the Mother, used hysteria as an explanation for mysterious medical occurrences in young women. He supposed that the hysteria caused by the "wandering" of the womb around the body was the source of witchcraft, and often presided in witchcraft-related trials as an expert on the subject. The Suffocation of the Mother connected the phenomenon of hysteria with actions like singing, laughing, crying, and choking.

Both "wandering womb" and "hysteria" are unused in medical theories of today.

See also
 Ancient Greek medicine
 Childbirth and obstetrics in antiquity
 Female genital prolapse
 Gynecology
 Medical research
 Women in medicine

References

Gynaecology
Obsolete medical theories
Ancient Greek medicine